The Austin Greyhound was a British two-seat biplane fighter aircraft of World War I built by car manufacturer Austin. Owing to the end of the War and an unreliable engine, it was unsuccessful, only three being built.

Development and design
In 1918, Britain's Royal Air Force issued the Type III specification for a replacement for the Bristol F.2 Fighter to be powered by the new ABC Dragonfly radial engine. The Austin Motor Company, who had produced large numbers of aircraft, including 800 Royal Aircraft Factory S.E.5s, submitted a design by J Kenworthy, formerly of the Royal Aircraft Factory, which was named the Austin Greyhound.  An order for three prototypes was placed on 18 May 1918.

The Greyhound was a two-bay biplane of all-wooden construction. The Greyhound's engine was covered by a conical cowling, with the cylinder heads protruding. The circular shape of the cowling continued down the fuselage. The upper and lower wings were almost the same size.

While the first prototype was quickly built, problems with the Dragonfly engine, which was found to be overweight and underpowered, and to have unsolvable reliability problems, meant that testing was delayed, with the second prototype being delivered to the Aeroplane and Armament Experimental Establishment at Martlesham Heath in January 1919, being followed by the first prototype in May and the third in February 1920.  Although performance was good no production was ordered of any of the competitors, with the Bristol Fighter remaining in service until 1932.  The last Greyhound remained in use as a flying test bed at the Royal Aircraft Establishment, Farnborough until June 1922.

Specifications

See also

References

External links
 Austin & Longbridge Aircraft Production

Greyhound
Biplanes
1910s British fighter aircraft
Aircraft first flown in 1919